Escape from New York is the first live album by the Sheffield, UK, instrumental post-rock band 65daysofstatic, released on 20 April 2009 by Monotreme Records.

Track listing

References

External links
 

2009 live albums
65daysofstatic albums
Music in Sheffield